The Road Haulage Association Ltd (RHA) is a private company limited by guarantee dedicated to the interests of the road haulage industry. It is the only trade association in the United Kingdom dedicated solely to road haulage. As a trade association, the RHA is responsible for campaigning, advice, training, information and business services for its members within the UK haulage industry, including audits, risk assessments and contracts of employment.

The RHA head office is located in Peterborough, and other offices are found in Bathgate and Cleckheaton. It currently has over 7,000 members who, between them, operate 100,000 commercial vehicles.

The RHA is also the publisher of the magazine Roadway.

The current Managing Director of the RHA is Richard Smith.

History
A previous iteration of the RHA existed from 1932-1935, and had 9,000 members. This was renamed the Associated Road Operators, which went on to merge with the Commercial Motor Users’ Association in 1945 and form what is the Road Haulage Association today.

In 1948, the RHA published RHD20, a rate schedule for its members, which was followed up in 1960 by the Black Book – The Long Distance Rates Guide. This was a publication with around 140,000 recommended rates for hauliers. The passing of the Restrictive Trade Practices Act 1974, however, meant that the RHA could no longer make recommendations to members on how rates should be increased to match costs, and the Black Book was discontinued.

Campaigns
Campaigns that the RHA has been involved with on behalf of its members include:

Increasing Speed Limits – In 2015, the speed limit for vehicles weighing over 7.5 tonnes was increased from 40 mph to 50 mph.

HGV Road User Levy – The HGV Road User Levy Act 2013, which aimed to reduce the taxation gap between UK and foreign-registered vehicles, introduced a levy requiring foreign HGVs to pay to use the UK road network.

Fuel Duty – An alliance with Fair Fuel UK which aimed to change HM Treasury’s stance on road-fuel duty. The campaign resulted in an annual saving of £6,000 per average 44-tonne truck.

Love The Lorry – Launched in 2015 with a function at the House of Commons, Love The Lorry is an annual series of events aimed at educating school-age children, promoting a career in logistics for students, and raising awareness of the industry that delivers 85% of the economy to the general public.

References

External links
 RHA website
 Roadway magazine
 Catalogue of the RHA archives, held at the Modern Records Centre, University of Warwick

Transport organisations based in the United Kingdom
Road haulage in the United Kingdom